Barovo may refer to:
 Barovo, Demir Kapija, North Macedonia
 Barovo, Sopište, North Macedonia